Eliminator is a multi-directional shooter space combat game, created and released by Sega/Gremlin in 1981. Similar to the monochrome Star Castle, Eliminator uses color vector graphics and allows both cooperative and competitive multiplayer gameplay. It is the only four-player vector game ever made.

Gameplay
Players pilot a space ship around the playfield (space) and must destroy alien drones. The ultimate goal is to evade and destroy the Eliminator, a huge asteroid base. The players fire causes any enemy that is struck (with the exception of the Eliminator itself) to rebound and careen off in another direction.  With a little skill, shots can propel the enemy into the Eliminator thus destroying them.  There is only one way to destroy the Eliminator, fire a cannon blast down the trench into its center.  This can be done directly or via a ricochet. Failure to destroy the Eliminator after a preset time causes the center to activate a drone that flies out of the Eliminator to shoot down the player with a destructive energy blast. The playfield becomes enclosed in an invisible barrier that bounces shots and ships off it, thus increasing the chances of death. Once the Eliminator is destroyed, the game restarts with a tougher set of enemies. The four player version allowed four players to simultaneously make attack runs on the Eliminator while trying to evade or destroy various other opponents. In four player mode, players must also dodge other player's ships.

Legacy 
The game is included as an unlockable game in the PSP version of Sega Genesis Collection.

References

External links 
 
 GameArchive's entry for Eliminator (copy at the Internet Archive)

1981 video games
Arcade video games
Sega arcade games
Vector arcade video games
Shooter video games
Gremlin Industries games
Video games developed in the United States